Bo Morgan Willy Lindström (born May 5, 1951) is a Swedish former ice hockey player for the Winnipeg Jets, Edmonton Oilers and Pittsburgh Penguins. He was a three-time Avco World Trophy winner with the Jets and two-time Stanley Cup winner with the Oilers.

Career
Willy Lindström was born i Grums, Värmland, Sweden. He began playing ice hockey in Grums IK during the 1960s.

Lindström joined Västra Frölunda HC in 1970 and made his debut in the top level ice hockey league in Sweden. Lindström signed a contract as a free agent with the Winnipeg Jets in the WHA in 1975. He was one of the top scorers in the WHA four years in a row.

Lindström was traded to the Edmonton Oilers for Laurie Boschman in March 1983. He won two Stanley Cups with the Edmonton Oilers in 1984 and 1985. Lindström is the only player to have had both Bobby Hull and Wayne Gretzky as teammates, as well as Mario Lemieux. Lindström scored five goals in a game against the Philadelphia Flyers at the Spectrum on 2 March 1982, becoming the first non-Canadian to accomplish the feat.

Lindström later returned to Swedish ice hockey, where he joined Brynäs IF. He ended his professional career in 1990.

Personal life
Lindström has a son Liam Lindström who played for the Phoenix RoadRunners of the ECHL, and in various levels of Swedish hockey.

Career statistics

Regular season and playoffs

International

Awards
 NHL Stanley Cup (1984, 1985)
 WHA Avco World Trophy  - 1976, 1978, 1979
 Won bronze medals at the World Ice Hockey Championships in 1974 and 1975
 MVP in 1977 WHA All-Star Game

References

External links
 

1951 births
Living people
Arizona Coyotes scouts
Brynäs IF players
Carolina Hurricanes scouts
Edmonton Oilers players
Frölunda HC players
Hartford Whalers scouts
People from Grums Municipality
Pittsburgh Penguins players
Stanley Cup champions
Swedish ice hockey right wingers
Undrafted National Hockey League players
Winnipeg Jets (1979–1996) players
Winnipeg Jets (WHA) players
Sportspeople from Värmland County